Donja Bukovica may refer to the following villages:

 Donja Bukovica (Maglaj), in the municipality of Maglaj, Bosna and Herzegovina
 Bukovica Donja, in the municipality of Bijeljina, Bosna and Herzegovina
 Donja Bukovica, Valjevo, in the municipality of Valjevo, Serbia
 , in the municipality of Šavnik, Montenegro
 , in the municipality of Nova Bukovica, Croatia

See also
 Gornja Bukovica (disambiguation)